Stygioides psyche is a species of moth of the family Cossidae. It is found in the Kyzylkumy desert in Uzbekistan.

References

Moths described in 1893
Cossinae